William Carl Buchan (born December 23, 1956) is an American sailor and Olympic Champion. He won the ICSA Men's Singlehanded National Championship and was named College Sailor of the Year in 1977. He competed at the 1984 Summer Olympics in Los Angeles and won a gold medal in the Flying Dutchman class.

He sailed for Stars & Stripes when they defended the 1988 America's Cup.

His father William E. Buchan won a gold medal in the Star class at the 1984 Olympics and 11 medals at the Star World Championships.  Carl attended Mercer Island High School in Mercer Island, Washington.

References

External links

1956 births
Living people
1988 America's Cup sailors
American male sailors (sport)
Flying Dutchman class world champions
ICSA College Sailor of the Year
Medalists at the 1984 Summer Olympics
Mercer Island High School alumni
North American Champions Soling
Olympic gold medalists for the United States in sailing
Sailors at the 1984 Summer Olympics – Flying Dutchman
Star class sailors
Star class world champions
US Sailor of the Year
Washington Huskies sailors
World champions in sailing for the United States